Michael Kukrle (born 17 November 1994) is a Czech cyclist, who currently rides for UCI Continental team .

Career
Kukrle joined  in 2016 and stayed with the team until 2022. In June 2021 he won the National Road race championship of the Czech Republic. Kukrle rode in the road race at the 2020 Summer Olympics he joined the early breakaway staying away for 180km before finishing in 36th.
In October 2021 it was announced that Kukrle would join  from 2022 on a 2 year contract. After  lost its UCI license and its riders lost their contracts on 1 March 2022, Kukrle was left without a job. On 30 March 2022 it was announced he would re-join .

Major results

2015
 1st  Mountains classification Carpathian Couriers Race
2016
 National Under-23 Road Championships
2nd Time trial
3rd Road race
 3rd Visegrad 4 Bicycle Race – GP Czech Republic
2017
 1st Stage 1 (TTT) Czech Cycling Tour
 4th Time trial, National Road Championships
2018
 1st  Overall Okolo Jižních Čech
 1st Stage 3 Czech Cycling Tour
 2nd Overall Grand Prix Cycliste de Gemenc
1st Prologue
 2nd Croatia–Slovenia
 3rd Time trial, National Road Championships
2019
 3rd Overall Czech Cycling Tour
 Visegrad 4 Bicycle Race
4th GP Slovakia
10th Kerékpárverseny
 5th Time trial, National Road Championships
2020
 1st  Overall Dookoła Mazowsza
1st Stage 3
2021
 1st  Road race, National Road Championships
 1st Brno–Velká Bíteš–Brno
 1st Memoriał Henryka Łasaka
 3rd Visegrad 4 Bicycle Race – GP Slovakia
 8th Overall Oberösterreich Rundfahrt
2022
 1st  Overall Tour du Pays de Montbéliard
1st Stage 1 (ITT)
 1st  Overall Tour du Loir-et-Cher
 2nd Time trial, National Road Championships
 3rd Memoriał Jana Magiery
 10th Overall Circuit des Ardennes
1st Stage 2 
 10th Memoriał Henryka Łasaka

References

External links

1994 births
Living people
People from Mohelnice
Czech male cyclists
Olympic cyclists of the Czech Republic
Cyclists at the 2020 Summer Olympics